The Akodessawa Fetish Market is located at Akodessawa, which is a district of Lomé, the capital of Togo in West Africa. The Akodessawa Fetish Market or Marche des Feticheurs is the world's largest voodoo market

The market features monkey heads, skulls, dead birds, crocodiles, skins and other products of dead animals.

Voodoo 
Voodoo has a long tradition in Togo. Centuries ago, slaves from Africa brought Yoruba gods to the Caribbean and South America. There it came to mixing of African gods with the saints of Christianity and the symbols of the Catholic Church. In course of time they changed their meaning. When former slaves and their families migrated to West Africa they developed a voodoo cult in the country of origin of their families.

Fetish 
The fetish is comparable to the Orisha of Yoruba. A fetish can be God, but also human, plant, animal or material. This depends on the ritual and the situation. In the ritual, the fetish is activated and strengthened. Fetishes may have been special people.

Literature 
 Voodoo Africaá Secret Power, 1980, 
 Afrika. Die Magier der Erde, Studienverlag 2010, 
 The Last Africans, 1977, 
 Afrika, Asien- Kunst- und Ritualobjekte, 1997, 
 Die Medizin der schwarzen Götter, 1997, 
 Die Medizin der schwarzen Götter: Magie und Heilkunst Afrikas, 1989,

References

External links 

West African Vodun